Xenomigia pinasi is a moth of the family Notodontidae. It is found along the eastern slope of the Ecuadorian Andes.

The length of the forewings is 19-19.5 mm for males and 21.5 mm for females. The ground color of the forewings is chocolate brown to dark brown. The surface of the hindwings is semi-hyaline on a ground color of dusty white. The veins are yellowish to cream colored and the anterior margin is light gray-brown.

Etymology
The species is named in honor of Francisco Pinas, a collector of Ecuadorian moths.

References

Moths described in 2008
Notodontidae of South America